Joachim Grieg (19 December 1849 – 7 December 1932) was a Norwegian ship broker and politician.  Grieg was the founder of Joachim Grieg & Co. (now Grieg Group) one of Norway's largest ship brokerage. He was also politically and civically active both nationally and locally.

Biography
Grieg was born in  Bergen, Norway.  He was the son of John Grieg (1819-1887) and Jutta Camilla Lous (1825-1901). Grieg was eldest siblings of eleven.  He attended Bergen Cathedral School and in 1865 went to sea for 13 years, In 1868, he passed the officer's exam and in 1870 the navigation exam and in 1871 the engineer exam for masters. In 1884, he founded a ship brokerage company during the period of transition from sail to steam.  Joachim Grieg & Co. (now Grieg Group) remains in operation to this day with offices in Bergen, Oslo and London.

Grieg held a number of public and civic offices.  He was a board member in Den Nationale Scene from 1893 to 1928.  He was acting chairman from (1903-1906) and (1925–1928). He was a member of Bergen city council and school board.  In 1919 he bought Troldhaugen, the home of his cousin, Edvard Grieg. In 1923, he donated the former residence to the municipality of Fana.

He was elected to the Parliament of Norway from 1906 to 1909, representing the Liberal Left Party.

Personal life
In 1879, he married  Henriette Juliane Lehmkuhl (1858-1937), daughter of merchant Joachim Ehrenreich Lehmkuhl (1822-1905) and Juliane Sophie Hammer (1819-1893). He was the brother of John Grieg (1856-1905); uncle of Sigurd Jebsen Grieg (1894-1973); cousin of Edvard Grieg (1843-1907); brother-in-law of Kristofer Lehmkuhl (1855-1949).
Joachim Grieg was appointed Knight of the 1st Class Order of St. Olav in 1905, won the Commander Cross of 2nd class in 1910 and had several foreign orders.

References

External links
Grieg Group website
Troldhaugen website

Related reading
Schreiner Johan  (1963) Norsk skipsfart under krig og høykonjunktur (Cappelen Damm) 

1849 births
1932 deaths
Businesspeople from Bergen in shipping
Norwegian business executives
Norwegian chief executives
Norwegian company founders
Members of the Storting
Free-minded Liberal Party politicians
20th-century Norwegian politicians
Recipients of the St. Olav's Medal
Politicians from Bergen